Chenar-e Sukhteh (also Romanized as Chenār-e Sūkhteh and Chenār Sūkhteh; also known as Chenār Sūkhteh va Toshak) is a village in Alaviyeh Rural District, Kordian District, Jahrom County, Fars Province, Iran. At the 2006 census, its population was 330, in 57 families.

References 

Populated places in Jahrom County